An Cosnmhaidh Ua Dubhda (died 1162) was the king of Ui Fiachrach Muaidhe.

His wife, Dubh Essa Bean Uí Dubhda, died in 1190.

Annalistic reference

 1162. Cosnamhaigh Ua Dubhda, lord of Ui-Amhalghadha, was slain by his own tribe.

External links
 http://www.ucc.ie/celt/published/T100005B/

References

 The History of Mayo, Hubert T. Knox, p. 379, 1908.
 Araile do fhlathaibh Ua nDubhda/Some of the princes of Ui Dhubhda, pp. 676–681, Leabhar na nGenealach:The Great Book of Irish Genealogies, Dubhaltach Mac Fhirbhisigh (died 1671), eag. Nollaig Ó Muraíle, 2004–05, De Burca, Dublin.

People from County Sligo
Monarchs from County Mayo
12th-century Irish monarchs
1162 deaths
Year of birth unknown